The Canucks–Flames rivalry is a rivalry that takes place in the Pacific Division of the National Hockey League between the Vancouver Canucks and the Calgary Flames. The Vancouver Canucks started play in the 1970–71 season as an expansion team and the Calgary Flames started play during the 1980–81 season as a relocated team from Atlanta (Atlanta Flames). This rivalry is notable in that both teams have played each other in three overtime game sevens in the playoffs, second only in the NHL to the St. Louis Blues and Minnesota North Stars/Dallas Stars.

History
The latter two series were decided in seven games by overtime goals (Joel Otto for Calgary and Pavel Bure for Vancouver) and coincidentally both managed to reach the Stanley Cup Finals during those seasons (with Calgary winning the cup in ).

In the early and mid-90s, the rivalry was considered among the most intense in the NHL, with the two teams often battling for top spot in the Smythe and later Pacific Division. However, it started to fade soon afterward as both teams started to sink in the standings in the late 1990s.

It was during the  season when the rivalry re-ignited, with the Canucks and Flames constantly battling for the top spot in the Northwest Division along with the Colorado Avalanche. When Canucks captain Markus Naslund and Flames captain Jarome Iginla developed into two of that era's greatest players, the rivalry became one of which team had the better overall leader. Between the beginning of the century and Naslund's departure from the Canucks in 2008, the spotlight would often be featured on both he and Iginla whenever the teams matched up. During the  season, the two found themselves competing for the Art Ross Trophy for the league's highest point scorer. The following year, both players were featured in a Nike commercial promoting the rivalry between them.

These two teams met again during the first round of the 2004 postseason, and, just like in 1989 and 1994, the series-winning goal was scored in overtime in game seven, this time by Calgary's Martin Gelinas (who incidentally was a member of the 1994 Canucks team that reached the Stanley Cup Finals). The Flames advanced to the Stanley Cup Finals, becoming the first Canadian team to reach that far since the 1994 Canucks. However, unlike 1989, but alike Vancouver in 1994 by the New York Rangers, they were defeated by the Lightning in seven games.

The subsequent trade by Vancouver for netminder Roberto Luongo in June 2006 gave the Canucks a capable opponent to Calgary's Miikka Kiprusoff, who had already established himself as one of the top goalies in the NHL. Players from both teams bring out their best when they play against each other, resulting in games of high entertainment value. In addition to the duel between Luongo and Kiprusoff, matchups between former Vancouver defenceman Willie Mitchell and Flames captain Jarome Iginla were also noteworthy.

The two teams reignited the rivalry on January 18, 2014 at Rogers Arena when the game started with a line brawl after the opening faceoff. Flames coach Bob Hartley started his fourth line that included tough guys Brian McGrattan and Kevin Westgarth. Interpreting it as a danger to his usual first line, Canucks coach John Tortorella sent his own fourth line onto the ice in response. As soon as the puck dropped, all ten skaters on the ice paired up and began fighting. It lasted several minutes before the referees got it under control with 8 players being ejected including Canucks forward Kellan Lain who was playing in his first NHL game. While the players fought, Tortorella and Hartley had a heated verbal exchange across the benches. During the first intermission, Tortorella angrily confronted the Flames in the hallway and continued to berate them as they went to their dressing room before players and staff from both teams broke it up. The Canucks would end up winning the game 3–2 in a shootout. Tortorella was ultimately suspended for 15 days following the incident due to his actions.

In 2015, the two teams met in the playoffs for the first time since 2004. Game 2 of this series saw multiple fights break out with 1:17 left in the third period resulting in a total of 132 penalty minutes. Deryk Engelland of the Flames was given the instigation penalty as well as 3 game misconducts, however the League retracted the penalty and instead fined Bob Hartley $50,000 for instigating the fight. The Canucks would win the game 4–1, but it was the Flames who came out victorious in the series, winning in six games.

The Flames' Brandon Bollig and Canucks' Brandon Prust squared off eight minutes later.

Hamonic suffered a facial fracture and was placed on IR, but returned later in October.

That season marked the most-ever regular season meetings between the two teams. The Flames won seven of the games and the Canucks won three.

See also
 National Hockey League rivalries

Notes

References

History of the Vancouver Canucks
Calgary Flames
National Hockey League rivalries